Brotia is a genus of Southeast Asian freshwater snails, gastropod molluscs in the  taxonomic family Pachychilidae.

The generic name Brotia is apparently in honor of a Swiss malacologist Auguste Louis Brot (1821-1896).

Distribution 
Species of Brotia occur in freshwater habitats of Southeast Asia, ranging from Northern India in the west through to Sumatra in the east. This range includes India, Myanmar, Bangladesh, Thailand, Laos, Vietnam, China (1 species), Cambodia, Malaysia and Indonesia (Sumatra and Borneo only).

Biology 
Species are found predominantly in fast flowing, well oxygenated rivers, occasionally also in lakes. They are gonochoristic, and viviparous, retaining developing eggs and youngs in special brood pouch.

Species 
Species within the genus Brotia include:

 † Brotia alpina (F. Sandberger, 1871) 
 Brotia annamita Köhler, Holford M., Do & Ho, 2009
 Brotia angulifera Brot, 1872 - incertae sedis
 Brotia armata (Brandt, 1874)
 Brotia assamensis (Nevill, 1885) - incertae sedis
 Brotia beaumetzi (Brot, 1887) - incertae sedis
 Brotia binodosa (Blanford, 1903)
 † Brotia bittneri (Oppenheim, 1895) 
 Brotia boenana (Brot, 1881)
 Brotia borneensis (Schepman, 1896) - incertae sedis
 † Brotia castellaunensis (Boussac, 1911) 
 Brotia citrina (Brot, 1868)
 Brotia clavaeformis (Brot, 1874)
 Brotia costula (Rafinesque, 1833)
 Brotia cylindrus (Brot, 1886) - incertae sedis
 Brotia dautzenbergiana (Morlet, 1884)
 Brotia episcopalis (H. Lea & I. Lea, 1851)
 Brotia godwini (Brot, 1875)
 Brotia henriettae (Griffith & Pidgeon, 1834)
 Brotia herculea (Gould, 1846)
 Brotia hoabinhensis Köhler, Holford, Do & Ho, 2009
 Brotia huberi Thach, 2021
 Brotia indragirica (von Martens, 1900)
 Brotia insolita (Brot, 1868)
 Brotia iravadica (Blanford, 1869)
 Brotia jullieni (Deshayes, 1874)
 Brotia kelantanesis (Preston, 1907)
 Brotia laodelectata Köhler, 2008
 † Brotia lhazeensis Yü, 1982 
 † Brotia lombersensis (Noulet, 1867) 
 † Brotia majevitzae (Oppenheim, 1901) 
 Brotia manningi Brandt, 1968
 Brotia mariae Köhler, 2008
 Brotia microsculpta Brandt, 1968
 Brotia pageli (Thiele, 1908)
 Brotia pagodula (Gould, 1847) - type species
 † Brotia palaeocostula Gurung, Takayasu & Matsuoka, 1997 
 Brotia paludiformis (Solem, 1966)
 Brotia peninsularis (Brandt, 1974)
 Brotia persculpta (Ehrmann, 1922)
 Brotia praetermissa Köhler & Glaubrecht, 2002
 Brotia pseudoasperata Brandt, 1968
 Brotia pseudosulcospira (Brandt, 1968)
 Brotia siamensis (Brot, 1886)
 Brotia solemiana (Brandt, 1968)
 Brotia sooloensis (Reeve, 1859) - incertae sedis
 Brotia spinata (Godwin-Austen, 1872) - incertae sedis
 Brotia subgloriosa (Brandt, 1968)
 Brotia sumatrensis (Brot, 1875)
 Brotia torquata (von dem Busch, 1842)
 Brotia verbecki (Brot, 1886)
 Brotia wykoffi (Brandt, 1974)
 Brotia yunnanensis Köhler, Du & Yang, 2010
 Brotia zonata (Benson, 1836) - incertae sedis

Synonyms:
 Brotia asperata (Lamarck, 1822): synonym of Jagora asperata (Lamarck, 1822)
 Brotia baccata (Gould, 1847): synonym of Brotia henriettae (Gray, 1834)
 Brotia delavayana Heude, 1888 : synonym  of Sulcospira delavayana (Heude, 1888)
  † Brotia escheri aquitanica (Noulet, 1846): synonym of  † Tinnyea aquitanica (Noulet, 1846) 
 † Brotia escheri auingeri (Handmann, 1882): synonym of † Tinnyea lauraea (Matheron, 1842) 
 Brotia hainanensis (Brot, 1872): synonym  of Sulcospira hainanensis (Brot, 1874)
 Brotia hamonvillei : synonym  of Sulcospira tonkiniana (Morelet, 1886)
 Brotia infracostata (Mousson, 1848): synonym of Sulcospira infracostata (Mousson, 1848)
 Brotia proteus (Bavay & Dautzenberg, 1908): synonym  of Sulcospira dakrongensis Köhler, Holford, Do & Ho, 2009
 Brotia swinhoei (H. Adams, 1870): synonym  of Sulcospira swinhoei (H. Adams, 1870)
 Brotia testudinaria (von dem Busch, 1842): synonym of Sulcospira testudinaria (von dem Busch, 1842)
 Brotia tourannensis: synonym of Sulcospira tourannensis (Souleyet, 1852)
 Brotia variabilis (Benson, 1836): synonym of Brotia costula (Rafinesque, 1833)

Variability of shells of Brotia (images in the first row are in the same ratio):

References

External links 
 Köhler F. & Deein G. (2010). "Hybridisation as potential source of incongruence in the morphological and mitochondrial diversity of a Thai freshwater gastropod (Pachychilidae, Brotia H. Adarns, 1866)". Zoosystematics and Evolution 86(2): 301-314. .

Gastropod genera
Brotia
Freshwater snails